Bernhard "Hadti" Dilling (born May 4, 1932 in Pfarrkirchen, Lower Bavaria - Germany; died March 22, 1994) was a German painter, graphic artist, sculptor and stage designer.

Life 
Bernhard "Hadti" Dilling attended art school in Augsburg from 1951 to 1952 in post war West Germany. From 1952 to 1957 he went on to study at the art academy in Munich visiting classes and works with Emil Pretorius and Helmut Jürgens in graphics, sculpture and stage design, both becoming very influential in his future works. While still a student, in October 1956, Dilling won third prize in an international poster competition organized by the Süddeutsche Zeitung. And in November 1956 he won first prize in a German poster competition.

After a apprenticeship at the Munich Kammerspiele, he was subsequently enployed as a stage designer, working at several theatres. Between 1957 and 1962 he worked at the Stadttheater Basel in Switzerland. Amongst a variety of productions, he here worked closely with the opera singer Grace Bumbry on the production of the opera Samson and Delilah and also with the Ukraine ballet master Waclaw Orlikowsky on the production of the opera Swan Lake.
From 1962 to 1963 he worked at the Hessisches Staatstheater Wiesbaden and from 1963 to 1966 at the Theater Münster. In Münster he was responsible for designing the stages for numerous opera, operetta and drama productions.

In 1967 he started his career as a freelance artist in Schapdetten near Münster.
From 1969 Dilling lived and worked in his birthplace of Pfarrkirchen, from about 1971 in the neighboring municipality of Postmünster. In his artistic work he uses various techniques, such as oil on canvas, screen printing, reverse glas painting, graphics and lithography. He is although known for his sculptures.

Bernhard Dilling died in the spring of 1994 at the age of 61 in Pfarrkirchen.

Exhibitions 
 1968: Academy Franz-Hitze-Haus, Münster 
 1995: ‘’From the Celts to Technology’’ – Pfarrkirchen 
 1999: ‘’Cruel Century – Technology’’, Blessing or Destruction - City Hall, Landshut 
 2001: ‘’TRI ART’’ – Hadti Dilling, Petra Widermann and Alois Demlehner – Heimathaus, Pfarrkirchen
 2008: Artrium, Bad Birnbach 
 2012: Former City Hall, Pfarrkirchen

Works (selection) 
in public space 
 1978 Fountain at the school in Falkenberg, Rottal-Inn 
 1980 Wind and waves - sculpture on the Rottauensee, Postmünster, Rottal-Inn

as a stage designer 
 Thierry Maulnier: The Empty Shell, spoken theatre, Hessisches Staatstheater Theater Wiesbaden, 1962/1963.
 René de Obaldia: Genousien, drama, German premiere, Hessisches Staatstheater Wiesbaden, January 1963.
 Paul Hindemith: Cardillac, opera, world premiere of the revised version, Theater Münster, 1964.
 Franz Lehár: The Land of Smiles, operetta, Theater Münster, 1965
 Giuseppe Verdi: Il trovatore, opera, Theater Münster, 1965 
 Richard Strauss: Arabella, opera, Theater Münster, 1965.
 Daniel Auber: Fra Diavolo, opera, Theater Münster, 1965.
 Franz Lehár: The Count of Luxembourg, operetta, Municipal Theater Münster, 1966.
 Giacomo Puccini: Tosca , opera, Hessisches Staatstheater Wiesbaden, October 23, 1966.

Literature

References

External links 

 Der Prophet aus dem Rottal, PNP plus, 29. Mai 2012.
 
 Collection of contemporary art in public space in Lower-Bavaria
 Bernhard (Hadti) Dilling (1932–1994). Digital Museum, Bayerische Künstlernachlässe e.V.
 Hadti Dilling Collection Buchner
 Bernhard Dilling Regio-Wiki Lower Bavaria

German male artists
German painters
German sculptors
1932 births
1994 deaths